Shmuel Rosner is an Israeli columnist, editor, and researcher.

He is a contributing opinion writer for the International New York Times.

He is the political editor of the Jewish Journal  for which he writes the daily blog Rosner's Domain. In 2008–2011, he wrote for The Jerusalem Post. In 2005–2008, he was chief United States correspondent for the daily newspaper Haaretz. Rosner writes in Hebrew for Maariv Daily.

Rosner is also the non-fiction chief editor for Israel's largest publishing house, Kinneret-Zmora-Dvir.

He is also a senior fellow at the Jewish People Policy Institute (JPPI).

Career & Life
Shmuel Rosner began his career in 1987 as a producer and editor with Israeli Army Radio. In 1991, he joined the Israeli daily Hadashot as a features and news editor. In 1994, he became editor of a local Israeli weekly, Tzomet Hasharon. He joined Haaretz in 1996. In 1995–1999, he was head of the features department, and in 1999–2005, he was the head of the News Division. In 2006, he began writing articles for Slate magazine's "Foreigners" feature. In 2008, Rosner's Domain – his blog – moved to The Jerusalem Post, and Rosner also moderated dialogues for the online publication Jewcy, blogged for Commentarys main blog, "Contentions", and wrote for The New Republic, The Jewish Review of Books, The Jewish Chronicle, and other publications.

In 2009, Rosner was appointed Non-fiction Editor for Kinneret Zmora-Bitan Dvir, Israel's leading publishing house. He also joined the Jewish People Policy Institute (JPPI) as a fellow, and started writing a weekend column on diplomatic and American affairs for Maariv.

Rosner lives in Tel Aviv with his wife, novelist Orna Landau. The couple has four children, Shaul, Yochai, Ariel, and Yael.

Published works

In 2011, Rosner's book Shtetl, Bagel and Baseball: On the Dreadful, Wonderful State of America's Jews was published by Keter Publishing House, one of the largest publishers in Israel. The book became a best seller.

In 2012, Rosner's second book, The Jewish Vote: Obama vs. Romney: A Voter's Guide, was published by Jewish Journal Books. It was reviewed by Jewish Journal book editor Jonathan Kirsch on October 8, 2012.

Rosner wrote several major reports on behalf of The Jewish People Policy Institute (JPPI):

In 2014, Rosner wrote a comprehensive report for JPPI that got a lot of media attention: Jewish and Democratic: Perspectives from World Jewry. The 150-page report concluded that "the idea that Israel should be a 'Jewish and democratic state' creates a conceptual framework that encompasses the views of the majority of Diaspora Jews (even though they give a wide variety of answers to the question of what precisely a 'Jewish and democratic state' is). Assertions that Israel should be 'only Jewish' or 'only democratic' are outside the consensus view of Diaspora Jews."

In 2015, Rosner (and JPPI colleague Brig. Gen. Michael Herzog) wrote a similar report: "Jewish Values and Israel’s Use of Force in Armed Conflict - Perspectives from World Jewry". This report argues that "the Jewish world understands the need and approves of the way Israel and the IDF use force in asymmetrical confrontations", but also that, "Despite this positive conclusion, many in the Jewish world are critical of particular Israeli policies that lead to the use of force. Many Jews doubt that Israel truly wishes to reach a peace settlement with the Palestinians, and few believe it is making the necessary effort to achieve one."

Critical acclaim
Jeffrey Goldberg of The Atlantic called Rosner "The leading Israeli blogger and all-around A1 Jew". M.J. Rosenberg, director of policy analysis at the Israel Policy Forum, and former American Israel Public Affairs Committee staffer and editor of AIPAC's Near East Report, describes Rosner as a "popular and provocative conservative". The Nation, in a profile of Haaretz, which employed Rosner, described him as "the paper's right-of-center chief US correspondent".

Rabbi Eric Yoffie, president of the Jewish Reform movement, wrote that, "Rosner is one of the more interesting commentators on this well-worn subject (Israel-Diaspora relations). While he trends conservative, he has an original, quirky, iconoclastic approach, and one never knows where he will end up." This introduction was followed by strong criticism of Rosner's views.

Controversy
Rosner has expressed the view that certain critique of Israeli policies by U.S. Jews is and should be ignored. His article said: "If all Jews are a family, it would be natural for Israelis to expect the unconditional love of their non-Israeli Jewish kin. If Jews aren't a family, and their support can be withdrawn, then Israelis have no reason to pay special attention to the complaints of non-Israeli Jews".

Selected articles
 Israel's Fair Weather Fans, New York Times, Aug. 7, 2014.

References

External links
 Shmuel Rosner's articles in the New York Times
 Rosner's Domain at the Jewish Journal, Shmuel Rosner's blog
 The Israel Factor, Rosner's Domain special feature on the US and Israel 
 Rosner's Guests, Shmuel Rosner's Q&As 
 Rosner's Domain at the Jerusalem Post, Shmuel Rosner's former blog
 Rosner's Domain, Shmuel Rosner's website 
 Jewish People Policy Institute
 Rosner is Hebrew (Maariv Daily)

Living people
Israeli journalists
Year of birth missing (living people)
People from Tel Aviv